Carl Chien (born 20 December 1964) is a Taiwanese businessman. He is currently the Vice Chairman of Asia Pacific at J.P. Morgan and a member of the bank’s Asia Pacific Management Committee, responsible for building and fostering senior client relationships throughout 17 markets in the region. He is also the Chief Executive Officer for J.P. Morgan Taiwan and additionally supervises business activities in Korea. Carl represents J.P. Morgan in international conferences including the Boao Forum for Asia, APEC Business Council, and Summer World Economic Forum.

Carl joined J.P. Morgan in 2002 to lead the firm’s Taiwan franchise. Prior to that, Carl worked at Goldman Sachs.

Carl has an MBA in International Commerce & Finance from Georgetown University, Washington D.C.

Career milestones 
1994-1997	Marketing Director for Asia, Morgan Stanley Asset Management, HK
1997	Executive Director, Goldman Sachs Asia LLC, HK
2002	General Manager, J.P. Morgan Chase Bank, Taiwan; spearheaded the acquisition of United World Chinese Commercial Bank by Cathay Financial Holdings
2004	Became the CEO of JPMorgan Chase Taiwan.
2005	J.P. Morgan Chase appointed by Taiwan Semiconductor Manufacturing Company Limited (TSMC) for the company's US$1.5 billion ADR offering. 
2007	Assisted Taiwan Mobile in acquiring Taiwan Fixed Network at US$2 billion, setting the record for the largest M&A in Taiwan.
2008	Fubon Financial's US$600 million acquisition of ING Life.
2009	Completed Taiwan Mobile's acquisition over Kbro Cable at US$1.8 billion.
2011	Led JPMorgan Chase to underwrite the overseas ECB issued by F-TPK. This deal put JPMorgan Chase in #1position of corporate finance in 2011.  After F-TPK was listed for public trading, 3 out of 4 of its fund raisings were underwritten by JPMorgan Chase, which totaled US$1.185 billion in value. Carl Chien was named by Business Weekly as "Best Investment Banker in M&A and Corporate Finance".
2012  Assisted Fubon Group in acquiring First Sino Bank; J.P. Morgan also helped Fubon Financial Holding Company to raise US$850 million via GDR offering for the acquisition financing – demonstrated J.P. Morgan's capability of providing thorough financial services.
2015 Became Head of Banking, Greater China.
2016 Appointed as Head of Banking, North Asia.
2016 Advised Hon Hai Group on the acquisition of Sharp, which was the largest cross border M&A transaction in Taiwan; also represented SPIL in the consolidation with ASE to jointly establish a holding company, which was the largest M&A transaction globally in the Outsourced Semiconductor Assembly and Test (“OSAT”) industry.
2017 Appointed as Vice Chairman, Asia Pacific.
2018 and 2019 Advised on Lite-On’s sale of camera module business to LuxVisions Innovation and sale of solid state drive business to Toshiba Memory Holdings
2020 Advised on Catcher’s US$1.43bn sale of phone casting business in China to Lens Technology; Led Hon Hai’s US$1.4bn dual-tranche senior bond offering and TSMC’s US$3.0bn triple-tranche senior bond offering
2021 Led TSMC’s US$3.5bn triple-tranche senior bond offering

References

1964 births
Living people
Businesspeople from Taipei
Goldman Sachs people
JPMorgan Chase employees
Morgan Stanley employees
20th-century Taiwanese businesspeople
21st-century Taiwanese businesspeople
Georgetown University alumni
Taiwanese emigrants to the United States